Love and the Home Guard (Swedish: Kärlek och landstorm) is a 1931 Swedish comedy film directed by Schamyl Bauman and starring Gideon Wahlberg, Gösta Gustafson and Ernst Brunman. The film's sets were designed by the art director Bertil Duroj. It was based on a play of the same title.

Synopsis
When the First World War breaks out in Europe in 1914, Sweden mobilises its landsturm to protect the country's neutrality.

Cast
 Gideon Wahlberg as Filip Andersson
 Gösta Gustafson as Jacob Söderberg
 Ernst Brunman as 	Josua Söderberg
 Aina Rosén as 	Frida Söderberg
 Thor Christiernsson as 	Flink 
 Carl-Gunnar Wingård as Salven 
 Ola Isene as 	Brandt
 Wictor Hagman as 	Dalenius
 Mary Gräber as 	Mia

References

Bibliography 
 Larsson, Mariah & Marklund, Anders. Swedish Film: An Introduction and Reader. Nordic Academic Press, 2010.

External links 
 

1931 films
Swedish comedy films
1931 comedy films
1930s Swedish-language films
Films directed by Schamyl Bauman
1930s Swedish films